White poplar is a common name used to refer to several trees in the genus Populus, including:

 Populus alba, native to Eurasia
 Populus grandidentata, bigtooth aspen
 Populus tremuloides, American aspen
 Populus tomentosa, Chinese white poplar